The Novosibirsk constituency (No.135) is a Russian legislative constituency in Novosibirsk Oblast. Zayeltsovsky constituency previously was based entirely in Novosibirsk, however, in 2015 Novosibirsk Oblast constituencies were gerrymandered. As the result, former Zayeltsovsky constituency was split between Novosibirsk and Central constituencies with the former gaining most of the dissolved constituency. Novosibirsk constituency also took rural northern Novosibirsk Oblast from Barabinsk constituency.

Members elected

Election results

1993

|-
! colspan=2 style="background-color:#E9E9E9;text-align:left;vertical-align:top;" |Candidate
! style="background-color:#E9E9E9;text-align:left;vertical-align:top;" |Party
! style="background-color:#E9E9E9;text-align:right;" |Votes
! style="background-color:#E9E9E9;text-align:right;" |%
|-
|style="background-color:#EA3C38"|
|align=left|Vasily Lipitsky
|align=left|Civic Union
|
|12.68%
|-
|style="background-color:"|
|align=left|Lyubov Shvets
|align=left|Independent
| -
|10.60%
|-
| colspan="5" style="background-color:#E9E9E9;"|
|- style="font-weight:bold"
| colspan="3" style="text-align:left;" | Total
| 
| 100%
|-
| colspan="5" style="background-color:#E9E9E9;"|
|- style="font-weight:bold"
| colspan="4" |Source:
|
|}

1995

|-
! colspan=2 style="background-color:#E9E9E9;text-align:left;vertical-align:top;" |Candidate
! style="background-color:#E9E9E9;text-align:left;vertical-align:top;" |Party
! style="background-color:#E9E9E9;text-align:right;" |Votes
! style="background-color:#E9E9E9;text-align:right;" |%
|-
|style="background-color:"|
|align=left|Eduard Yankovsky
|align=left|Independent
|
|15.26%
|-
|style="background-color:"|
|align=left|Anatoly Lokot
|align=left|Communist Party
|
|13.99%
|-
|style="background-color:#DD137B"|
|align=left|Vasily Lipitsky (Incumbent)
|align=left|Social Democrats
|
|11.60%
|-
|style="background-color:#2C299A"|
|align=left|Aleksandr Lyulko
|align=left|Congress of Russian Communities
|
|8.63%
|-
|style="background-color:"|
|align=left|Sergey Pronichev
|align=left|Liberal Democratic Party
|
|6.98%
|-
|style="background-color:"|
|align=left|Konstantin Komarov
|align=left|Independent
|
|6.87%
|-
|style="background-color:#019CDC"|
|align=left|Vladimir Ivankov
|align=left|Party of Russian Unity and Accord
|
|4.76%
|-
|style="background-color:"|
|align=left|Ivan Permyakov
|align=left|Independent
|
|4.52%
|-
|style="background-color:"|
|align=left|Karim Kamalov
|align=left|Independent
|
|3.56%
|-
|style="background-color:"|
|align=left|Viktor Mamatov
|align=left|Agrarian Party
|
|2.33%
|-
|style="background-color:#F9E2E3"|
|align=left|Igor Lyuzenkov
|align=left|Tikhonov-Tupolev-Tikhonov
|
|2.05%
|-
|style="background-color:"|
|align=left|Igor Batenev
|align=left|Democratic Russia and Free Trade Unions
|
|1.61%
|-
|style="background-color:"|
|align=left|Oleg Shcherbatenko
|align=left|Education — Future of Russia
|
|1.43%
|-
|style="background-color:"|
|align=left|Ilya Konstantinov
|align=left|Independent
|
|1.21%
|-
|style="background-color:"|
|align=left|Vladimir Pakhomov
|align=left|Independent
|
|1.14%
|-
|style="background-color:#000000"|
|colspan=2 |against all
|
|11.95%
|-
| colspan="5" style="background-color:#E9E9E9;"|
|- style="font-weight:bold"
| colspan="3" style="text-align:left;" | Total
| 
| 100%
|-
| colspan="5" style="background-color:#E9E9E9;"|
|- style="font-weight:bold"
| colspan="4" |Source:
|
|}

1999

|-
! colspan=2 style="background-color:#E9E9E9;text-align:left;vertical-align:top;" |Candidate
! style="background-color:#E9E9E9;text-align:left;vertical-align:top;" |Party
! style="background-color:#E9E9E9;text-align:right;" |Votes
! style="background-color:#E9E9E9;text-align:right;" |%
|-
|style="background-color:"|
|align=left|Aleksandr Karelin
|align=left|Unity
|
|25.18%
|-
|style="background-color:"|
|align=left|Anatoly Lokot
|align=left|Communist Party
|
|19.36%
|-
|style="background-color:"|
|align=left|Georgy Glebov
|align=left|Yabloko
|
|15.08%
|-
|style="background-color:#3B9EDF"|
|align=left|Andrey Filichev
|align=left|Fatherland – All Russia
|
|13.36%
|-
|style="background-color:"|
|align=left|Vladimir Ivankov
|align=left|Independent
|
|4.43%
|-
|style="background-color:"|
|align=left|Aleksey Manannikov
|align=left|Independent
|
|4.12%
|-
|style="background-color:"|
|align=left|Eduard Yankovsky (incumbent)
|align=left|Independent
|
|2.56%
|-
|style="background-color:"|
|align=left|Nadezhda Boltenko
|align=left|Independent
|
|2.02%
|-
|style="background-color:#FCCA19"|
|align=left|Yelizaveta Strogaya
|align=left|Congress of Russian Communities-Yury Boldyrev Movement
|
|1.21%
|-
|style="background-color:#D50000"|
|align=left|Vladimir Italyansky
|align=left|Communists and Workers of Russia - for the Soviet Union
|
|1.15%
|-
|style="background-color:"|
|align=left|Pyotr Ilyin
|align=left|Liberal Democratic Party
|
|1.00%
|-
|style="background-color:#084284"|
|align=left|Aleksey Medvedev
|align=left|Spiritual Heritage
|
|0.71%
|-
|style="background-color:"|
|align=left|Sergey Kozlov
|align=left|Independent
|
|0.54%
|-
|style="background-color:"|
|align=left|Anatoly Kubanov
|align=left|Independent
|
|0.30%
|-
|style="background-color:"|
|align=left|Aleksandr Arsenyev
|align=left|Independent
|
|0.22%
|-
|style="background-color:"|
|align=left|Pavel Koluzakov
|align=left|Independent
|
|0.21%
|-
|style="background-color:#000000"|
|colspan=2 |against all
|
|17.16%
|-
| colspan="5" style="background-color:#E9E9E9;"|
|- style="font-weight:bold"
| colspan="3" style="text-align:left;" | Total
| 
| 100%
|-
| colspan="5" style="background-color:#E9E9E9;"|
|- style="font-weight:bold"
| colspan="4" |Source:
|
|}

2003

|-
! colspan=2 style="background-color:#E9E9E9;text-align:left;vertical-align:top;" |Candidate
! style="background-color:#E9E9E9;text-align:left;vertical-align:top;" |Party
! style="background-color:#E9E9E9;text-align:right;" |Votes
! style="background-color:#E9E9E9;text-align:right;" |%
|-
|style="background-color:"|
|align=left|Anatoly Lokot
|align=left|Communist Party
|
|24.50%
|-
|style="background-color:"|
|align=left|Viktor Ignatov
|align=left|The Greens
|
|15.31%
|-
|style="background:#1042A5"| 
|align=left|Aleksandr Fomin
|align=left|Union of Right Forces
|
|11.01%
|-
|style="background-color:"|
|align=left|Konstantin Karakhalin
|align=left|Rodina
|
|7.62%
|-
|style="background-color:"|
|align=left|Olga Lesnevskaya
|align=left|Social Democratic Party
|
|6.08%
|-
|style="background-color:"|
|align=left|Pyotr Ilyin
|align=left|Liberal Democratic Party
|
|5.67%
|-
|style="background-color:"|
|align=left|Aleksandr Shadt
|align=left|Independent
|
|2.03%
|-
|style="background-color:#7C73CC"|
|align=left|Viktor Ostrolutsky
|align=left|Great Russia – Eurasian Union
|
|1.29%
|-
|style="background-color:#000000"|
|colspan=2 |against all
|
|23.86%
|-
| colspan="5" style="background-color:#E9E9E9;"|
|- style="font-weight:bold"
| colspan="3" style="text-align:left;" | Total
| 
| 100%
|-
| colspan="5" style="background-color:#E9E9E9;"|
|- style="font-weight:bold"
| colspan="4" |Source:
|
|}

2016

|-
! colspan=2 style="background-color:#E9E9E9;text-align:left;vertical-align:top;" |Candidate
! style="background-color:#E9E9E9;text-align:left;vertical-align:top;" |Party
! style="background-color:#E9E9E9;text-align:right;" |Votes
! style="background-color:#E9E9E9;text-align:right;" |%
|-
|style="background-color: " |
|align=left|Andrey Kalichenko
|align=left|United Russia
|
|36.33%
|-
|style="background-color:"|
|align=left|Andrey Zhirnov
|align=left|Communist Party
|
|27.05%
|-
|style="background-color:"|
|align=left|Natalia Krasovskaya
|align=left|Liberal Democratic Party
|
|11.01%
|-
|style="background-color:"|
|align=left|Dmitry Stakanovsky
|align=left|A Just Russia
|
|4.00%
|-
|style="background:"| 
|align=left|Georgy Mikhaylov
|align=left|Communists of Russia
|
|3.85%
|-
|style="background-color:"|
|align=left|Vasily Soroka
|align=left|Rodina
|
|3.46%
|-
|style="background-color:"|
|align=left|Sergey Boyko
|align=left|Yabloko
|
|3.28%
|-
|style="background-color:"|
|align=left|Olesya Dumchenko
|align=left|The Greens
|
|1.87%
|-
|style="background:"| 
|align=left|Aidar Barantayev
|align=left|People's Freedom Party
|
|1.45%
|-
|style="background:#00A650"| 
|align=left|Dmitry Yevtushenko
|align=left|Civilian Power
|
|1.08%
|-
|style="background:"| 
|align=left|Lyubov Ukhalova
|align=left|Patriots of Russia
|
|0.82%
|-
| colspan="5" style="background-color:#E9E9E9;"|
|- style="font-weight:bold"
| colspan="3" style="text-align:left;" | Total
| 
| 100%
|-
| colspan="5" style="background-color:#E9E9E9;"|
|- style="font-weight:bold"
| colspan="4" |Source:
|
|}

2021

|-
! colspan=2 style="background-color:#E9E9E9;text-align:left;vertical-align:top;" |Candidate
! style="background-color:#E9E9E9;text-align:left;vertical-align:top;" |Party
! style="background-color:#E9E9E9;text-align:right;" |Votes
! style="background-color:#E9E9E9;text-align:right;" |%
|-
|style="background-color:"|
|align=left|Oleg Ivaninsky
|align=left|United Russia
|
|31.29%
|-
|style="background-color:"|
|align=left|Andrey Zhirnov
|align=left|Communist Party
|
|24.76%
|-
|style="background-color:"|
|align=left|Igor Ukraintsev
|align=left|The Greens
|
|9.32%
|-
|style="background-color:"|
|align=left|Natalia Krasovskaya
|align=left|Liberal Democratic Party
|
|6.69%
|-
|style="background-color:"|
|align=left|Denis Rodin
|align=left|A Just Russia — For Truth
|
|5.37%
|-
|style="background-color: " |
|align=left|Natalya Pinigina
|align=left|New People
|
|5.03%
|-
|style="background-color: "|
|align=left|Nikita Fedchenko
|align=left|Party of Pensioners
|
|3.56%
|-
|style="background-color:"|
|align=left|Konstantin Antonov
|align=left|Rodina
|
|2.77%
|-
|style="background: "| 
|align=left|Natalya Chubykina
|align=left|Yabloko
|
|1.73%
|-
|style="background: "| 
|align=left|Dmitry Kryukov
|align=left|Russian Party of Freedom and Justice
|
|1.67%
|-
|style="background:"| 
|align=left|Pavel Yerokhin
|align=left|Party of Growth
|
|1.54%
|-
|style="background:"| 
|align=left|Rafael Adam
|align=left|Civic Platform
|
|1.48%
|-
| colspan="5" style="background-color:#E9E9E9;"|
|- style="font-weight:bold"
| colspan="3" style="text-align:left;" | Total
| 
| 100%
|-
| colspan="5" style="background-color:#E9E9E9;"|
|- style="font-weight:bold"
| colspan="4" |Source:
|
|}

Notes

References

Russian legislative constituencies
Politics of Novosibirsk Oblast